Anna Sergeyevna Sen (born 3 December 1990) is a Russian handball player for Rostov-Don and the Russian national team.

Achievements
Olympic Games:
Gold Medalist: 2016
European Championship:
Silver Medalist: 2018
Russian Super League
Gold Medalist: 2016/17, 2017/18, 2018/19
Russian Super Cup:
Bronze Medalist: 2017, 2018, 2019
EHF Champions League:
Finalist: 2018/2019
Fourth place: 2017/2018
EHF Cup:
Gold Medalist: 2017
European Junior Championship:
Bronze Medalist: 2009

References

External links

1990 births
Living people
Sportspeople from Krasnodar
Russian female handball players
Győri Audi ETO KC players
Olympic medalists in handball
Olympic handball players of Russia
Olympic gold medalists for Russia
Medalists at the 2016 Summer Olympics
Medalists at the 2020 Summer Olympics
Handball players at the 2016 Summer Olympics
Handball players at the 2020 Summer Olympics
Expatriate handball players
Russian expatriate sportspeople in Hungary
Olympic silver medalists for the Russian Olympic Committee athletes